The 2016–17 SpVgg Greuther Fürth season is the 114th season in the club's football history.

Review and events
In 2016–17 the club plays in the 2. Bundesliga.

The club also takes part in the 2016–17 edition of the DFB-Pokal, the German Cup.

Friendly matches

Competitions

2. Bundesliga

League table

Matches

DFB-Pokal

Overall

Sources

Greuther Furth
SpVgg Greuther Fürth seasons